Tokorogawa Dam  is a gravity dam located in Hokkaido Prefecture in Japan. The dam is used for power production. The catchment area of the dam is 17.3 km2. The dam impounds about 1  ha of land when full and can store 79 thousand cubic meters of water. The construction of the dam was completed in 1932.

References

Dams in Hokkaido